is a 2011 Japanese 3D jidaigeki drama film directed by Takashi Miike. It was produced by Jeremy Thomas and Toshiaki Nakazawa, who previously teamed with Miike on his 2010 film 13 Assassins. The film is a 3D remake of Masaki Kobayashi's 1962 film Harakiri.

It premiered at the 2011 Cannes Film Festival, the first 3D film to do so. The Village Voice Michael Atkinson praised it describing it as "a melodramatic deepening and a grisly doubling-down of Kobayashi's great original". Composer and pop star Ryuichi Sakamoto wrote the original score.

Plot
In 1635, Tsukumo Hanshiro's clan has lost its status and he requests permission to perform seppuku in the courtyard of the castle of Lord Ii. Senior retainer Saitō Kageyu tells Hanshiro the tale of Squire Chijiiwa Motome, another samurai from the same clan who had visited with the same request the previous year in 1634. Suspecting that he was bluffing in order to obtain money, Ii's retainers scheduled the ritual immediately with Omodaka Hikokurō acting as second. Motome begged for one more day and 3 ryō to treat his sick wife and child. His request was refused, so he began to perform seppuku ineffectively with his bamboo sword, breaking it inside his stomach. Omodaka insisted that he should cut himself more but Saitō eventually chopped off his head to end the suffering.

Saitō offers to forget the request but Hanshiro insists on continuing with the ritual. He requests Omodaka as his second, but he cannot be found. His next two requests as second, Matsuzaki and Kawabe, cannot be found either. Hanshiro tells them that in June 1617 Motome's father Chijiiwa Jinnai performed unauthorized maintenance work on the castle and was banished. He died and left Motome in the care of Tsukumo Hanshiro. In 1630, Motome married Hanshiro's daughter Miho. Her infant son fell ill and Motome sold his sword to cover costs for a while but when a doctor demanded 3 ryo in advance for treatment, Motome attempted the suicide bluff that led to his death. His son died of illness and Miho killed herself with the same broken bamboo sword after Motome's body was returned to her with 3 ryo. Disgusted at the gruesome nature of Motome's death, Hanshiro hunted down Omodaka, Matsuzaki, and Kawabe and cut off their topknots for not stopping Motome's painful death, causing them to lose face and go into hiding.

Hanshiro brings the 3 ryo back to Saitō and challenges the other samurai with a bamboo sword, battling many of them capably. He says that a warrior's honor is not something just worn for show and knocks down the castle's decorative suit of armor before accepting death. Omodaka, Matsuzaki, and Kawabe all commit seppuku out of shame and the other retainers reassemble the suit of armor. Lord Ii returns to the castle and asks if the suit of armor has been polished, because it is the pride of the castle.

Cast
 Ichikawa Ebizō XI as Tsukumo Hanshiro
 Eita as Chijiiwa Motome
 Hikari Mitsushima as Miho
 Naoto Takenaka as Tajiri
 Munetaka Aoki as Omodaka Hikokurō
 Hirofumi Arai as Matsuzaki Hayatonoshō
 Kazuki Namioka as Kawabe Umanosuke
 Yoshihisa Amano as Sasaki
 Takehiro Hira as Ii Kamon-no-kami Naotaka
 Takashi Sasano as Sōsuke
 Nakamura Baijaku II as Chijiiwa Jinnai
 Kōji Yakusho as Saitō Kageyu

References

External links
 
 

2011 films
2010s historical drama films
2011 3D films
2011 drama films
Japanese historical drama films
2010s Japanese-language films
Remakes of Japanese films
Japanese 3D films
Films about suicide
Films directed by Takashi Miike
Films produced by Jeremy Thomas
Films scored by Ryuichi Sakamoto
Films set in castles
Films set in Edo
Films set in 1634
Films set in 1635
Jidaigeki films
Samurai films
HanWay Films films
Recorded Picture Company films
Shochiku films
2010s Japanese films